Rose Mackenberg (July 10, 1892 – April 10, 1968) was an American investigator specializing in fraudulent psychic mediums, known for her association with Harry Houdini. She was chief of a team of undercover investigators who investigated mediums for Houdini in the 1920s. After Houdini's death she continued to investigate spiritualist fraud for over 20 years and was known as an expert on the subject. She testified in court cases and before Congress and was interviewed in national magazines and on television.

Early life 
Mackenberg was born July 10, 1892, and lived in Brooklyn, New York City. In her early years she worked  as a stenographer in a law office and as an investigator in New York City. She later reported that, in her early life, she had believed that psychics and fortunetellers really were able to communicate with spirits and foretell the future.

Houdini's investigator 
In the early 1920s, Mackenberg was working on a case involving investment losses that had been advised by a psychic medium. She sought out Houdini's help in the case, as he was very publicly engaged in a campaign against false mediums.

Houdini was impressed with the young woman, and educated her on the tricks that mediums use to manipulate their victims. In 1925, Houdini hired her for his undercover investigator team. The team included several other women besides Mackenberg, including Houdini's niece Julia Sawyer and a showgirl named Alberta Chapman. Houdini also sometimes employed men including Clifford M. Eddy, Jr., Robert H. Gysel, and Amadeo Vacca.

While Houdini was on tour in 1925 and 1926, Mackenberg and the other investigators would precede him by up to 10 days into each city, and perform undercover investigations of the local spiritualists or psychic mediums. They would use multiple false names, sometimes containing puns like "Frances Raud" (for FRAUD) and "Alicia Bunck" (for All Is A Bunk). They would also wear various disguises to avoid being found out. Mackenberg would sometimes even wear a hearing aid she didn't need.

Mackenberg did investigations for Houdini and sometimes appeared on stage with him in many cities on those tours including Indianapolis, Worcester, Mass. Washington, D.C. Chicago, New York and Montreal. Her very detailed written reports for Houdini have been studied and exhibited in museums.
When Houdini later performed in each city, he would debunk local mediums from the stage, presenting the gathered evidence. Naturally Houdini and his investigators became the target of great anger from the spiritualists. It was said he carried a Derringer and he advised Mackenberg to carry a gun as well, but she refused.

Mackenberg earned the respect of Houdini and his team, and was considered his chief investigator. The other investigators sometimes called her "The Rev" because of the multiple bogus spiritualist diplomas and titles she had acquired during her investigations. Prior to his death, Houdini set up secret codes with more than twenty friends to attempt to communicate with them from beyond the grave. Mackenberg was among those chosen, and in 1945 she reported "the message has not come through."

Expert on psychic fraud 

Because of her investigative work, Mackenberg became an expert on the practices of fraudulent psychics. She claimed to have investigated over 1,000 mediums and never found one who was not a fraud. For example, the various mediums had claimed to communicate with over three dozen non-existent deceased husbands, despite Mackenberg being single. According to William Lindsay Gresham,  Julien Proskauer credited Mackenberg for "much of his material" in his book The Dead Do Not Talk.

Congressional testimony 
In the first session of the 69th Congress, an anti-fortunetelling law for Washington, D.C., was put forward on the urging of Houdini. The Copeland-Bloom bill (H.R. 8989) came before a House committee beginning February 26, 1926. Houdini was to testify in its favor.

Following the same pattern as during the tour, Mackenberg visited local Washington mediums in the days prior to the hearings. She targeted local mediums including Jane B. Coates and Madam Grace Marcia who were scheduled to testify against the bill.  Her testimony on May 18, 1926, included the revelation that Coates had told her that Senators Capper, Watson, Dill, and Fletcher "had come to her for readings" and that "table tipping seances are held at the White House" with President Coolidge and his family. This was met with raucous denials in the committee room, and a "fracas" ensued. The meeting was adjourned. President Coolidge did not officially respond to the accusation but unofficial denials were made known in the press. Ultimately H.R. 8989 did not pass, but the hearings received wide press coverage.

Lockwood's estate 
After Houdini's death in October 1926, Mackenberg continued to investigate fraudulent psychics for over 20 years and serve as an expert on them in various venues. One court case in Pennsylvania involved the 1939 will of Augustus T. Lockwood. He had bequeathed a large sum of money to a "Spiritualistic College to Educate Mediums" at Lily Dale, New York, a famous camp and meeting place for Spiritualists. The state of Pennsylvania sought to invalidate the will, in part on the argument that the bequest would benefit criminal behavior and thus would be "against public policy". Mackenberg was called as the "star witness" and the state was successful at trial. The case was appealed, however, and overturned by higher courts.

Public outreach 
In addition to her investigations, Mackenberg attempted to educate the public on psychic fraud.  She toured the country giving lectures on psychic fraud to various groups, a typical talk title was “Debunking the Ghost Racket”. These talks would include demonstrations of techniques used by psychics including spirit trumpets, table tipping, billet reading and so on.

She wrote a series of articles on the "ghost racket" which were serialized to newspapers in 1929 and posthumously anthologized and re-published in 2016. A manuscript titled So You Want to Attend a Seance? gathered these reports, but the manuscript itself has never been published. She also assisted with investigations which were published in major media outlets such as Popular Science, The Chicago Tribune and The Saturday Evening Post. She appeared on television talk shows including Mike and Buff and Tonight Starring Steve Allen.

Personal life 
She remained single and continued to live in the New York City area in a "well lighted" apartment ("because I get tired of dark rooms"). Her friends called her "Mac". Mackenberg died in April 1968.

Representations in popular culture 

In 2017, Mackenberg was featured alongside Houdini in re-enactment sequences during season 14, episode 13 of the Travel Channel's documentary series Mysteries at the Museum.  The re-enactments included Mackenberg's investigations of spiritualist seances and her 1926 congressional testimony.

See also
Ann O'Delia Diss Debar ("One of the most extraordinary fake mediums... the world has ever known" -Houdini)
Bob Nygaard (Psychic fraud investigator) 
Charlatan
Con artist
Confidence trick
Fortune telling fraud
List of con artists
List of confidence tricks
Televangelist Peter Popoff exposed by James Randi

References

Bibliography and further reading

External links
  has photos of Mackenberg demonstrating seance techniques in 1951
  has photos of Mackenberg in her disguises

1892 births
1968 deaths
American skeptics
Critics of Spiritualism
Paranormal investigators
Private detectives and investigators
People from Brooklyn
20th-century American women writers
Harry Houdini